Joshua McKoon (born February 25, 1979) is an American politician from the state of Georgia. He is a member of the Republican Party and formerly represented the 29th district in the Georgia State Senate.

In 2017, McKoon announced that he would not be seeking re-election for State Senate. He ran for Georgia Secretary of State, but came in third in the primary receiving nearly 112,000 votes.

References

External links
Campaign Website
Georgia State Senate Official Page
Joshua McKoon at Ballotpedia

Living people
Republican Party Georgia (U.S. state) state senators
Place of birth missing (living people)
21st-century American politicians
1979 births